Watson Island may refer to:

 Watson Island, an island in the city of Miami, United States
 Watson Island (Queensland), Australia
 Watson's Island, County Down, is a townland in County Down, Northern Ireland
 Watson Island (British Columbia), at the entrance to Mackenzie Sound on the north side of the Broughton Archipelago, on the Central Coast of British Columbia, Canada
 Watson Island (Port Edward), an unincorporated area in Port Edward, on the North Coast of British Columbia
 Watson Island (Algoma), in the Algoma District of Ontario, Canada
 Watson Island (Muskoka), in the Muskoka region of Ontario, Canada
 Watson Islands, Nunavut, Canada